Otto Hartmann (1904–1994) was an Austrian stage and film actor. Following Austria's incorporation into Nazi Germany, Hartmann acted as an informer for the authorities (Gestapo). In punishment for this he was imprisoned after the Second World War had ended.

Selected filmography
 Bright Eyes (1929)
 Father Radetzky (1929)
 Madame Bluebeard  (1931)
 The Case of Colonel Redl (1931)
 The Hymn of Leuthen (1933)
 Our Emperor (1933)
 Suburban Cabaret (1935)
 Asew (1935)
 Court Theatre (1936)
 The White Dream (1943)

During the war 
Hartmann was a member of the Österreichische Freiheitsbewegung (Austrian freedom movement, a nonviolent conservative catholic resistance group), whose goal was the liberation from National Socialism and the detachment of Austria from the German Reich. He collected Information about this group and other resistance groups and assembled lists of their members. He gave this information to the Gestapo, leading to the arrest of 450 members of the resistance movement, some of which were subsequently sentenced to death, others to long terms in prison.

After the war 
As Vienna was conquered by the Russian Red Army, in spring 1945 with about 200 other Gestapo informants, Hartmann traveled from Vienna to Innsbruck to hide from the authorities. Through contacts with the Austrian resistance, he got a job at the police, but was soon arrested by the French occupation forces, who handed him over to the Austrian authorities in Vienna.

On 22 November 1947 he was sentenced to life by the People's Court in Vienna.

Pardon and future life 
He repeatedly tried to obtain a retrial or a pardon, which was rejected in the subsequent period. Eventually, as part of an amnesty, he was pardoned in 1957 for a trial period of five years. Hartmann then worked as a seller and a clerk at various Viennese companies.

References

Bibliography
 Thomas Weyr. The Setting of the Pearl: Vienna under Hitler. Oxford University Press, 2005.

External links

1904 births
1994 deaths
Austrian male film actors
Austrian male stage actors
Gestapo agents
Austrian Nazis convicted of war crimes
Austrian prisoners sentenced to life imprisonment
Male actors from Vienna

Prisoners sentenced to life imprisonment by Austria